

Results
Arsenal's score comes first

London Combination

Selected results from the league.

Final league table

References

1917-18
English football clubs 1917–18 season